Candace A. Curtis (born September 25, 1955) was a Michigan politician.

Early life
Curtis was born on September 25, 1955.

Education
Curtis graduated from Grand Blanc High School. In 1982, Curtis earned a B.A. in communications from Michigan State University.

Career
Curtis at some point served as Genesee County commissioner, representing the 6th District. On November 3, 1992, Curtis was elected to the Michigan House of Representatives where she represented the 51st district from January 13, 1993 to December 31, 1998. In 2006, Curtis was an unsuccessful candidate in the Democratic primary for the Michigan Senate seat representing the 27th district.

Personal life
Candace Curtis married Michael Curtis and had one son. Candace is Methodist.

References

Living people
1955 births
Methodists from Michigan
Michigan State University alumni
County commissioners in Michigan
Women state legislators in Michigan
People from Genesee County, Michigan
Democratic Party members of the Michigan House of Representatives
20th-century American politicians
20th-century American women politicians